Interlude is a compilation album by the Dutch symphonic metal band Delain.

The album is described in a press release as "a fantastic blend of brand-new songs, special versions and mixes of popular Delain tracks, covers, and the single 'Are You Done With Me'." Interlude also includes a special DVD featuring exclusive live footage and clips from the band's career.

Track listing

CD 
 "Breathe on Me" - 3:30
 "Collars and Suits" - 4:41
 "Are You Done with Me" (New Single Mix) - 3:08
 "Such a Shame" (Talk Talk cover) - 3:39
 "Cordell" (The Cranberries cover) - 3:50
 "Smalltown Boy" (Bronski Beat cover) - 3:09
 "We Are the Others" (New Ballad Version) - 3:42
 "Mother Machine" (Live) - 5:47
 "Get the Devil Out of Me" (Live) - 3:44
 "Milk and Honey" (Live) - 4:37
 "Invidia" (Live) - 4:04
 "Electricity" (Live) - 5:06
 "Not Enough" (Live) - 5:01

DVD 
 "Invidia" (Video Live @ Metal Female Voices Fest)
 "Electricity" (Video Live @ Metal Female Voices Fest)
 "We Are the Others" (Video Live @ Metal Female Voices Fest)
 "Milk and Honey" (Video Live @ Metal Female Voices Fest)
 "Not Enough" (Video Live @ Metal Female Voices Fest)
 Backstage Footage
 "Get the Devil Out of Me" (Video)
 "We Are the Others" (Video)
 "April Rain" (Video)
 "Frozen" (Video)

Personnel

Delain
Charlotte Wessels - vocals
Guus Eikens - rhythm guitars
Otto Schimmelpenninck van der Oije - bass
Martijn Westerholt - keyboards
Sander Zoer - drums

Charts

Release history

References

2013 compilation albums
Delain albums
Symphonic metal compilation albums
Roadrunner Records albums
Napalm Records albums